The relations between Bosnia and Herzegovina and Croatia were established on 7 July 1992, following both countries' declarations of independence from Yugoslavia during its breakup and Yugoslav Wars.

The two countries have a comparable population (3.4 million for BiH, 3.8 million for Croatia in 2021) and area (51,129 km2 for BiH, 56,594 km2 for Croatia). Croatia's GDP (PPP) per capita is double that of Bosnia and Herzegovina's ($37,549 vs $17,935 in 2022). 

Croatian is also one of the official languages of Bosnia and Herzegovina, together with Bosnian and Serbian, both of which are also recognized as minority languages of Croatia; the three are fully mutually intelligible standard varieties of Serbo-Croatian.

Croats (544,780 persons at the 2013 census) comprise 15.43% of the country's population and 22.4% of the Federation entity, where 91% of them live. Four out of ten Federation's cantons have Croat majority. Bosniaks in Croatia amounted to 24,131 at the 2021 census (0.6%).

Both countries are full members of the Council of Europe. Croatia joined the European Union in 2013, while Bosnia and Herzegovina is a candidate for EU accession. 

Bosnia and Herzegovina has an embassy in Zagreb, while Croatia has an embassy in Sarajevo and six consulates in Sarajevo, Banja Luka, Mostar, Tuzla, Livno and Vitez. The two countries share a  border - the second longest external EU land border after the Finland-Russia border.

Demographics
Croats of Bosnia and Herzegovina (544,780 persons at the 2013 census) comprise 15.43% of the country's population and 22.4% of the Federation entity, where 91% of them live. Four out of ten Federation's cantons have Croat majority. Bosniaks in Croatia amounted to 31,479 at the 2011 census (0.7%). 

The two countries do not have an agreement on dual citizenship, and the number of persons with double citizenship is therefore unclear. According to the Croatian Ministry of Interior, 384,631 Croatian citizens had registered residence in Bosnia and Herzegovina in July 2019.
35,547 citizens of Croatia cast their vote at polling stations in Bosnia and Herzegovina for the 2019–20 Croatian presidential election, and 21,898 for the parliamentary elections in July 2020.

Several high-level Croatian politicians have been born in Bosnia and Herzegovina, including:
World War II Croatian fascist leaders Ante Pavelić, from Bradina, and Maks Luburić, from Ljubuški;
Zagreb's mayor Milan Bandić, from Grude;
Minister of Defence Gojko Šušak, from Široki Brijeg;
Minister of Foreign Affairs Marija Pejčinović Burić, from Mostar;
Minister of Foreign Affairs Gordan Grlić-Radman, from Prisoje;
Members of Parliament Nino Raspudić (from Mostar), Nevenko Barbarić (from Klobuk), Daniel Spajić (from Žepče), Ljubica Maksimčuk (from Teslić), Radoje Vidović (from Fojnica), Pero Ćosić (from Buhovo);

Some of them have been active politically in both countries, including:
Božo Ljubić, from Uzarići, BiH Minister of Communication (2007–2009), member of Parliament of Croatia
Željana Zovko, from Mostar, ambassador of Bosnia and Herzegovina and later Member of the European Parliament from Croatia

Bosnia and Herzegovina's Foreign Affairs Minister Bisera Turković was born in Sisak, Croatia.

Diplomatic relations

Bosnia and Herzegovina's and Croatia's diplomatic relations started with Croatia recognizing Bosnia and Herzegovina on 24 January 1992, which Bosnia and Herzegovina reciprocated on 7 April the same year, and both countries finally signed an agreement of mutual friendship and co-operation on 21 July the same year, during the series of Yugoslav Wars. Together, Bosnia and Herzegovina and Croatia have signed 111 various treaties deliminating issues ranging from establishment of diplomatic missions to resolving border disputes.

The Croatian embassy in Bosnia and Herzegovina is located in Sarajevo and its 6 consulates are located in Sarajevo (consulate-general), Banja Luka, Mostar, Livno, Vitez and Tuzla. The current Croatian ambassador in BiH is Ivan Sabolić. Current BiH ambassador in Croatia is Azra Kalajdžisalihović.

Bosnia and Herzegovina has its embassy in Zagreb. Beside the embassy, there is one consulate-general of Bosnia and Herzegovina in Croatia, also located in Zagreb.

Croatia's role in the Bosnian War

Both Bosnia and Herzegovina and Croatia were engaged in the early-1990s Yugoslav wars. In parallel to its own war of independence, Croatia was involved in the armed conflict on Bosnia and Herzegovina's territory. At first, Bosniaks and Croats fought in an alliance against the Yugoslav People's Army (JNA) and the Army of Republika Srpska (VRS). By the end of 1992, however, tensions in Central Bosnia increased, leading to open conflict by early 1993, when Croats established the Croatian Republic of Herzeg-Bosnia. 

The Croat–Bosniak War opposed from 18 October 1992 to 23 February 1994 the Republic of Bosnia and Herzegovina and the self-proclaimed Croatian Republic of Herzeg-Bosnia, supported by Croatia. Most of the fighting took place in Central Bosnia and in the Herzegovina region between the Army of the Republic of Bosnia and Herzegovina (ARBiH), and the Croatian Defence Council (HVO). The most symbolic episode of the conflict was the destruction of Mostar's Old Bridge by the Croat militia's bombing on 9 November 1993. On 23 February 1994, a ceasefire was reached, and the Washington Agreement was signed on 18 March 1994 leading to the establishment of the Federation of Bosnia and Herzegovina and joint operations against the Serb forces, which helped alter the military balance and bring the Bosnian War to an end.

Croatia was a signatory of the Dayton Peace Agreement, on behalf of itself and of the Croat militias in BiH, thus assuming international obligations. This role is often misrepresented in Croatia as the one of "guarantor" of the agreement. 

The International Criminal Tribunal for the former Yugoslavia (ICTY) convicted 17 HVO and Herzeg-Bosnia officials, six of whom were convicted for participating in a joint criminal enterprise that sought to annex or control Croat-majority parts of Bosnia and Herzegovina, and two ARBiH officials for war crimes committed during the conflict. The ICTY ruled that Croatia had overall control over the HVO and that the conflict was international in character.

According to the CIA World Factbook, 7,269 Croatian refugees still live in Bosnia and Herzegovina and the country has 131,600 internally displaced persons.

Yugoslav succession issues

Property restitution
The 2001 agreement on Yugoslavia's succession issues foresaw a follow-up bilateral agreement on the restitution of specific properties of Bosnia and Herzegovina on the territory of Croatia, which include petrol stations, hotels (such as the Hidrogradnja complex in Baška Voda), and assets at the ports of Sibenik and Ploče, for a total worth estimated at 10 billion euros. 64 such assets have been registered by the Republika Srpska entity, and 78 by the Federation entity; there is no State-level single registry. Negotiations for a bilateral agreement lasted until 2012, when they were discontinued due to Croatia's unwillingness to agree with Republika Srpska's request for a right to perpetual ownership of the properties. In 2018, Croatia adopted a law on state property management, allowing the rental of such properties with concessions for up to 30 years. This raised concerns in Bosnia and Herzegovina.

War crimes prosecution
The cooperation between the two countries' prosecutors' offices need to be strengthened in order to deliver tangible results in the fight against impunity for war crimes; Croatia has de facto stopped cooperating with BiH on war crimes cases where the accused are Croats.

Extradition
As of May 2009, Bosnia and Herzegovina and Croatia have not signed a treaty of mutual extradition of the countries' citizens, owing to many convicted people fleeing to the other country and attaining dual citizenship to be virtually immune to extradition. These people have included Ognjen Šimić, a surgeon from Rijeka convicted to nine years in prison for accepting bribes; Ante Jelavić, a former president of the Presidency of Bosnia and Herzegovina convicted in Croatia to 9.5 years for alleged abuse of position at the Bank of Herzegovina in Mostar; and others. According to Bosnia and Herzegovina government, fourteen people sentenced in Bosnia and Herzegovina live self-exiled as Croatian citizens. As of 2009, the two countries were working on an agreement that would allow imprisoning such escapees for their sentences within their current country of residence without their consent (the status quo version requires consent of the escapee, which is usually not given).

Border issues
The two countries have several small disputed sections of the boundary, the most prominent of which is the one related to maritime access. 

Bosnia and Herzegovina and Croatia agreed on a border demarcation treaty in 1999. The treaty was signed by the two former presidents, Alija Izetbegović and Franjo Tuđman, but it was never ratified by the respective parliaments, therefore it never entered into force. Croatia continues to administer areas that the deal assigns to Bosnia and Herzegovina. The agreement foresees a definition of the two countries' territory, in the area of the Pelješac peninsula which is slightly different from what is shown on maps, since Croatia agreed to recognise the sovereignty of Bosnia and Herzegovina over two small rock islands (Mali Školj and Veliki Školj) and the tip of the peninsula of Klek near Neum.

Una river
Sections of the Una River and villages at the base of Mount Plješevica are in Croatia, while some are in Bosnia, which means that there would have to be nine border crossings on a single route. Lack of action on this problem impedes any serious development in the region. The Zagreb–Bihać–Split railway line is still closed for major traffic due to this issue.

The border on the Una River between Hrvatska Kostajnica on the northern, Croatian side of the river, and Kostajnica on the southern, Bosnian side, is also being discussed. A river island between the two towns is under Croatian control, but is claimed by Bosnia and Herzegovina. A shared border crossing point has been built and has been functioning since 2003, and is used without hindrance by either party.

Neum

The Herzegovinian municipality of Neum in the south makes the southernmost part of Croatia (Dubrovnik–Neretva County) an exclave. In 1999, a border agreement between former Croatian President Franjo Tuđman and President of Bosnia and Herzegovina Alija Izetbegović moved the Croatia – Bosnia and Herzegovina border near Neum from the very coast (during SFR Yugoslavia era and confirmed by the Badinter Arbitration Committee) further into the sea waters of the Mali Ston Bay, placing two Croatian islands (Mali and Veliki Škoj, incidentally translated into English as Little and Big Island) under Bosnia-Herzegovina sovereignty. Six years later, the Croatian government called for the ratification of this agreement; however, as of 2007, it was not ratified. The two countries negotiated Neum Agreement and Ploče Agreement defining special arrangements for Croatian transit traffic through Neum and Bosnia and Herzegovina access to the port of Ploče to compensate for non-contiguity of Croatian territory between Ploče and Dubrovnik and lack of a seaport in Bosnia and Herzegovina.

Pelješac Bridge and access to the high seas

Croatia has opted to build a bridge to the Pelješac peninsula to connect the Croatian mainland with the exclave as part of the A1 motorway Zagreb–Dubrovnik. 
On 7 June 2017, the European Commission approved the Croatian Major Project "Road to South Dalmatia" which aims at connecting the southern Dalmatian peninsula of Peljesac with the mainland and thus connect Dubrovnik-Neretva County with the rest of the country. This territory is now separated from the rest of Croatia by around 9 km large corridor of territory of Bosnia and Herzegovina. The project has a total cost of € 526 million with a total eligible cost of € 420 million and an ERDF co-financing of € 357 million. 

Croatia claims that the bridge is located exclusively within Croatian territory and Croatian territorial waters and that it is thus entitled under the international law of the sea to construct the bridge without requiring any consent from Bosnia and Herzegovina. Croatia also expressed commitment to fully respect the international rights enjoyed by other countries in the Pelješac peninsula, including the right of innocent passage enjoyed by all countries under the United Nations Convention on the Law of the Sea, and the right of Bosnia and Herzegovina to have unrestricted access to the high seas. Croatia recalled that the foreseen height of the bridge (55 m, 180 ft) will allow the totality of the current Bosnian shipping to use the existing navigational route to transit under the bridge, and that in case any ship taller than 55 meters (180 ft) would need to call on a port in Bosnia and Herzegovina, it could dock instead at the Croatian Ploče port, in line with the 1995 Free Transit agreement.

The construction of the bridge has also been opposed by various political actors in Bosnia and Herzegovina, mostly Bosniak, as they deem it would complicate the country's access to international waters. Bosnian authorities initially opposed the building of the bridge, originally planned to be only 35 meters (115 feet) high, because it would have made it impossible for large ships to enter the harbor of Neum. Although Neum harbor is not currently fit for commercial traffic, and most of the trade to and from Bosnia and Herzegovina goes through the Croatian port of Ploče, the Bosnian government declared that a new one might be built in the future, and that the construction of the bridge would compromise this ambition.

On 17 October 2007, the Presidency of Bosnia and Herzegovina adopted an official position stating that "Bosnia and Herzegovina opposes the construction of the [Pelješac] bridge until the issues related to the determination of the sea borderline between the two countries are resolved" and asking Croatia not to undertake any unilateral actions concerning the construction of the bridge. Bosnian MP Halid Genjac has stated that such official position has never been reverted and is thus still in force, while no official Bosnian body has given its express consent to the construction of the bridge. He argued that “the claims that Croatia is building a bridge on its territory are incorrect because the sea waters beneath the Peljesac bridge are not and cannot be Croatian or internal waters, but international waters stretching from the territorial waters of Bosnia and Herzegovina to the open sea,” Genjac argued.

Other bilateral issues

Political relations and status of the Croat people in Bosnia and Herzegovina

In 2018, Croatia objected to the election of Željko Komšić as Croat member of the Presidency of Bosnia and Herzegovina, who was elected mainly by the Bosnian Muslim voters. The Croatian Parliament adopted a Resolution on the situation of Croats in Bosnia and Herzegovina. This resolution was deemed by the Office of the High Representative as in violation of Croatia's obligations of non-interference under the Dayton Agreement.

Croatia’s conveyed the view that the election of Komsić should never happen again, as it is seen as undermining "the equality of constituent nations" in Bosnia and Herzegovina, between the three main ethnic groups of Bosniaks, Croats, and Serbs. Croatia also continues to voice its support for constitutional and electoral reforms that would enable Croats in Bosnia and Herzegovina to have legitimate representatives in the legislative and executive bodies of Bosnia and Herzegovina, especially the House of Peoples of the Federation of Bosnia and Herzegovina, the upper house of the Federation of Bosnia and Herzegovina, an entity of Bosnia and Herzegovina where the vast majority of the Croats of Bosnia and Herzegovina lives, and the Presidency of Bosnia and Herzegovina.

Two schools under one roof

Croatia is a sponsor of Bosnia and Herzegovina's segregated school system, exemplified by the "two schools under one roof". Children from two ethnic groups, Bosniaks and Croats, attend classes in the same building, but physically separated from each other and taught separate curricula. Children from one ethnic group often enter the school through one door, while children from other ethnic group through another. In the Federation entity of BiH, 57 schools operated in this way in the year 2010. By 2018, 56 such schools remained.
This phenomenon of ethnic separation is attributed to the Croat–Bosniak War (1992–1994) and the creation of Herzeg-Bosnia on the territory of Bosnia and Herzegovina. Croatia continue to finance the system of separate Croatian-curriculum public schools in BiH.

Migration management

Since 2018, increased migratory flows pose challenges at the border between Croatia and Bosnia and Herzegovina, in particular along the region of Una-Sana Canton. Since January 2018, around 32,000 migrants have entered BiH, out of them around 7,200 are estimated be in BiH currently. Civil society and international organisations has reported violent collective expulsion (pushbacks) of migrants and asylum seekers back into Bosnia and Herzegovina. Croatian authorities have rejected these accusations. The Croatian Ombudsman has, however, raised serious concerns on the activities of Croatian police at the border with BiH.

Nuclear waste disposal site in Trgovska Gora
Bosnia and Herzegovina objects to Croatia's plans to build a radioactive waste disposal site across the border in Trgovska Gora, Dvor (former Cerkezovac barracks).

Pollution from the Brod fuel refinery
Croatia complains about the cross-border impact of pollution from the fuel refinery in Brod (BiH), owned by Russian state-owned company Zarubezhneft. After an explosion incident on 9 October 2018 that left one person dead and ten injured, the refinery ceased operations. The company has not announced its shutdown, but the refinery remains closed down as of 2022.

Economic development

Transport
As Bosnia and Herzegovina and Croatia each share the largest part of their border with the other, they have participated in numerous joint ventures aimed at providing a regional economic uplift. One of such projects is the widening of Pan-European Corridor Vc (E73) to freeway standards. Although extending to the Adriatic Sea all the way from Budapest, the capital of Hungary, Corridor Vc (in Bosnia and Herzegovina designated as A1) is purported to bear most importance for Bosnia and Herzegovina as its longest turnpike (at ) and a national project of sorts. It passes through Croatia at two stretches: one in eastern Slavonia near Osijek and Đakovo (A5) and the other at the coast near Ploče and Metković (A10). Croatia and Bosnia and Herzegovina have so far co-operated in building a bridge over Sava River near Svilaj, Croatia, which connects the northern end of Corridor Vc to the southern end of Croatian A5.

Trade
Exports to Bosnia and Herzegovina amount to 14.4% of Croatia's total, while as of 2007, Bosnia and Herzegovina is the fifth largest trade partner of Croatia. This makes Croatia both the largest importer and exporter of Bosnia and Herzegovina, while Bosnia and Herzegovina is the second largest buyer of Croatian goods. With 343 million convertible marks (US$237 million) of invested foreign capital, Croatia is the largest investor in Bosnia and Herzegovina, topping nearby Slovenia (BAM 302 million; US$208 million) and neighboring Serbia and Montenegro (BAM 122 million; US$84 million). In 2007, the trade between the two countries amounted to 2,517 million US dollars (BAM 3.64 billion; HRK 13.63 billion), a 32% increase from the past year.

HT Eronet ownership
The third telecommunication company of Bosnia and Herzegovina, HT Eronet, is owned 50.1% by the Federation of Bosnia and Herzegovina and 39% by Hrvatski Telekom. Bosnian Croat politician Dragan Čović had been charged with abuse of power and authority during the privatization of Eronet in 1999, but was acquitted by the FBiH Supreme Court in April 2013. The company is considered to be under heavy political influence by the HDZ BiH party and a source of patronage. A due diligence by international advisors was requested by the IMF as a prior action in 2016, and completed only in early 2019.

Cooperation in the EU accession process of Bosnia and Herzegovina
A bilateral agreement on cooperation in the EU accession process was signed in 2016.

See also 
Foreign relations of Bosnia and Herzegovina
Foreign relations of Croatia
Accession of Bosnia and Herzegovina to the European Union 
Bosnia and Herzegovina–Serbia relations
Croatia–Russia relations#2000—2020
Agreement on Succession Issues of the Former Socialist Federal Republic of Yugoslavia

References

External links
Croatian Embassy in Sarajevo: English (currently down), Croatian
Bosnia and Herzegovina Ministry of Foreign Affairs on its embassy in Zagreb

 
Croatia
Bilateral relations of Croatia